The 1998–99 Luxembourg Cup was the sixth playing of the Luxembourg Cup ice hockey tournament. Seven teams participated in the tournament, which was won by Tornado Luxembourg.

Final standings

External links 
 Season on hockeyarchives.info

Luxembourg Cup
Luxembourg Cup (ice hockey) seasons